Heligoland (Heligolandic Frisian: , , Mooring Frisian:) is a small archipelago in the North Sea. A part of the German state of Schleswig-Holstein since 1890, the islands were historically possessions of Denmark, then became the possessions of the United Kingdom from 1807 to 1890, and briefly managed as a war prize from 1945 to 1952.

The islands are located in the Heligoland Bight (part of the German Bight) in the southeastern corner of the North Sea and had a population of 1,127 at the end of 2016. They are the only German islands not in the vicinity of the mainland. During a visit to the islands, August Heinrich Hoffmann von Fallersleben wrote the lyrics to "", which became the national anthem of Germany.

In addition to German, the local population, who are ethnic Frisians, speak the Heligolandic dialect of the North Frisian language called .

Name
The island had no distinct name before the 19th century. It was often referred to by variants of the High German Heiligland ('holy land') and once even as the island of the Holy Virgin Ursula. Theodor Siebs summarized the critical discussion of the name in the 19th century in 1909 with the thesis that, based on the Frisian self-designation of the Heligolanders as Halunder, the island name meant 'high land' (similar to Hallig). In the following discussion by Jürgen Spanuth, Wolfgang Laur again proposed the original name of Heiligland. The variant Helgoland, which has appeared since the 16th century, is said to have been created by scholars who Latinized a North Frisian form Helgeland, using it to refer to a legendary hero, Helgi. The discussion is complicated by a disagreement as to which of the listed names really refers to the island of Helgoland, and by a desire for the island still to be seen as holy today.

Geography

It is not permanently inhabited, but is today the location of Heligoland's airfield.

The  came into being in 1947 as a result of explosions detonated by the British Royal Navy (the so-called "Big Bang"; see below).

The two islands were connected until 1720 when the natural connection was destroyed by a storm flood.

The main island has a good harbour and is frequented mostly by sailing yachts.

History

The German Bight and the area around the island are known to have been inhabited since prehistoric times. Flint tools have been recovered from the bottom of the sea surrounding Heligoland. On the Oberland, prehistoric burial mounds were visible until the late 19th century, and excavations showed skeletons and artifacts. Moreover, prehistoric copper plates have been found underwater near the island; those plates were almost certainly made on the Oberland.

In 697, Radbod, the last Frisian king, retreated to the then-single island after his defeat by the Franks—or so it is written in the Life of Willebrord by Alcuin. By 1231, the island was listed as the property of the Danish king Valdemar II. Archaeological findings from the 12th to 14th centuries suggest that copper ore was processed on the island.

There is a general understanding that the name "Heligoland" means "Holy Land" (compare modern Dutch and German heilig, "holy"). In the course of the centuries several alternative theories have been proposed to explain the name, from a Danish king Heligo to a Frisian word, hallig, meaning "salt marsh island". The 1911 Encyclopædia Britannica suggests Hallaglun, or Halligland, i.e. "land of banks, which cover and uncover".

Traditional economic activities included fishing, hunting birds and seals, wrecking and—very important for many overseas powers—piloting overseas ships into the harbours of Hanseatic League cities such as Bremen and Hamburg. In some periods Heligoland was an excellent base point for huge herring catches. Until 1714 ownership switched several times between Denmark–Norway and the Duchy of Schleswig, with one period of control by Hamburg. In August 1714, it was conquered by Denmark–Norway, and it remained Danish until 1807.

19th century

On 11 September 1807, during the Napoleonic Wars,  brought to the Admiralty the despatches from Admiral Thomas Macnamara Russell announcing Heligoland's capitulation to the British. Heligoland became a centre of resistance and intrigue against Napoleon. Denmark then ceded Heligoland to George III of the United Kingdom by the Treaty of Kiel (14 January 1814). Thousands of Germans came to Britain and joined the King's German Legion via Heligoland.

The British annexation of Heligoland was ratified by the Treaty of Paris signed on 30 May 1814, as part of a number of territorial reallocations following the abdication of Napoleon as Emperor of the French.

The prime reason at the time for Britain's retention of a small and seemingly worthless acquisition was to restrict any future French naval aggression against the Scandinavian or German states. In the event, no effort was made during the period of British administration to make use of the islands for military purposes, partly for financial reasons but principally because the Royal Navy considered Heligoland to be too exposed as a forward base.

In 1826, Heligoland became a seaside spa and soon turned into a popular tourist resort for the European upper class. The island attracted artists and writers, especially from Germany and Austria who apparently enjoyed the comparatively liberal atmosphere, including Heinrich Heine and August Heinrich Hoffmann von Fallersleben. More vitally it was a refuge for revolutionaries of the 1830s and the 1848 German revolution.

As related in The Leisure Hour, it was "a land where there are no bankers, no lawyers, and no crime; where all gratuities are strictly forbidden, the landladies are all honest and the boatmen take no tips", while The English Illustrated Magazine provided a description in the most glowing terms: "No one should go there who cannot be content with the charms of brilliant light, of ever-changing atmospheric effects, of a land free from the countless discomforts of a large and busy population, and of an air that tastes like draughts of life itself."

Britain ceded the islands to Germany in 1890 in the Heligoland–Zanzibar Treaty. The newly unified Germany was concerned about a foreign power controlling land from which it could command the western entrance to the militarily-important Kiel Canal, then under construction along with other naval installations in the area and thus traded for it. A "grandfathering"/optant approach prevented the inhabitants of the islands from forfeiting advantages because of this imposed change of status.

Heligoland has an important place in the history of the study of ornithology, and especially the understanding of migration. The book Heligoland, an Ornithological Observatory by Heinrich Gätke, published in German in 1890 and in English in 1895, described an astonishing array of migrant birds on the island and was a major influence on future studies of bird migration.

In 1892, the Biological Station of Helgoland was founded by phycologist Paul Kuckuck, a student of Johannes Reinke (leading marine phycologist).

20th century

Under the German Empire, the islands became a major naval base, and during the First World War the civilian population was evacuated to the mainland. The island was fortified with concrete gun emplacements along its cliffs similar to the Rock of Gibraltar. Island defences included 364 mounted guns including 142  disappearing guns overlooking shipping channels defended with ten rows of naval mines. The first naval engagement of the war, the Battle of Heligoland Bight, was fought nearby in the first month of the war. The islanders returned in 1918, but during the Nazi era the naval base was reactivated.

Werner Heisenberg (1901–1976) first formulated the equation underlying his picture of quantum mechanics while on Heligoland in the 1920s. While a student of Arnold Sommerfeld at Munich, Heisenberg first met the Danish physicist Niels Bohr in 1922 at the Bohr Festival, Gottingen. He and Bohr went for long hikes in the mountains and discussed the failure of existing theories to account for the new experimental results on the quantum structure of matter. Following these discussions, Heisenberg plunged into several months of intensive theoretical research but met with continual frustration. Finally, suffering from a severe attack of hay fever that his aspirin and cocaine treatment was failing to alleviate, he retreated to the treeless (and pollenless) island of Heligoland in the summer of 1925. There he conceived the basis of the quantum theory.

In 1937, construction began on a major reclamation project intended to expand existing naval facilities and restore the island to its pre-1629 dimensions, restoring large areas which had been eroded by the sea. The project was largely abandoned after the start of World War II and was never completed.

World War II
The area was the setting of the aerial Battle of the Heligoland Bight in 1939, a result of Royal Air Force bombing raids on Kriegsmarine warships in the area. The waters surrounding the island were frequently mined by Allied aircraft.

Heligoland also had a military function as a sea fortress in the Second World War. Completed and ready for use were the submarine bunker North Sea III, the coastal artillery, an air-raid shelter system with extensive bunker tunnels and the airfield with the air force –  (April to October 1943). Forced labour of, among others, citizens of the Soviet Union was used during the construction of military installations during World War II.

On 3 December 1939, Heligoland was directly bombed by the Allies for the first time. The attack, by twenty four Wellington bombers of 38, 115 and 149 squadrons of the Royal Air Force failed to destroy the German warships at anchor.

Early in the war, the island was generally unaffected by bombing raids. Through the development of the Luftwaffe, the island had largely lost its strategic importance. The , temporarily used for defense against Allied bombing raids, was equipped with a rare variant of the Messerschmitt Bf 109 fighter originally designed for use on aircraft carriers.

Shortly before the war ended in 1945, Georg Braun and Erich Friedrichs succeeded in forming a resistance group. Shortly before they were to execute the plans, however, they were betrayed by two members of the group. About twenty men were arrested on 18 April 1945; fourteen of them were transported to Cuxhaven. After a short trial, five resisters were executed by firing squad at Cuxhaven-Sahlenburg on 21 April 1945 by the German authorities.

To honour them, in April 2010 the Helgoland Museum installed six stumbling blocks on the roads of Heligoland. Their names are Erich P. J. Friedrichs, Georg E. Braun, Karl Fnouka, Kurt A. Pester, Martin O. Wachtel, and Heinrich Prüß.

With two waves of bombing raids on 18 and 19 April 1945, 1,000 Allied aircraft dropped about 7,000 bombs on the islands. The populace took shelter in air raid shelters. The German military suffered heavy casualties during the raids. The bomb attacks rendered the island unsafe, and it was totally evacuated.

Explosion

From 1945 to 1952 the uninhabited islands fell within the British Occupation zone and were used as a bombing range. On 18 April 1947, the Royal Navy detonated 6,700 tonnes of explosives ("Operation Big Bang" or "British Bang") in an attempt to destroy the island entirely and remove it as a fleet base location for Germany. This resulted in one of the biggest single non-nuclear detonations in history.

Return of sovereignty to Germany
On 20 December 1950, two students and a professor from Heidelberg – René Leudesdorff, Georg von Hatzfeld and Hubertus zu Löwenstein – occupied the off-limits island and raised various German, European and local flags. The students were arrested by the soldiers present and brought back to Germany. The event started a movement to restore the islands to West Germany, which gained the support of the West German parliament. On 1 March 1952, Heligoland was returned to German control, and the former inhabitants were allowed to return. The first of March is an official holiday on the island. The German authorities cleared a significant quantity of unexploded ordnance and rebuilt the houses before allowing its citizens to resettle there.

21st century

Heligoland, like the small exclave Büsingen am Hochrhein, is now a holiday resort and enjoys a tax-exempt status, being part of Germany and the EU but excluded from the EU VAT area and customs union. Consequently, much of the economy is founded on sales of cigarettes, alcoholic beverages and perfume to tourists who visit the islands.

Energy supply
Before the island was connected to the mainland network by a submarine cable in 2009, electricity on Heligoland was generated by a local diesel plant.

Heligoland was the site of a trial of GROWIAN, a large wind turbine testing project. In 1990, a 1.2 MW turbine of the MAN type WKA 60 was installed. Besides technical problems, the turbine was not lightning proof and insurance companies would not provide coverage. The wind energy project was viewed as a failure by the islanders and was stopped.
It was manufactured by the North German Seacable Works in a single piece and was laid by the barge Nostag 10 in 2009. The cable is designed for an operational voltage of 30 kV, and reaches the German mainland at Sankt Peter-Ording.

Expansion plans and wind industry
Plans to re-enlarge the land bridge between different parts of the island by means of land reclamation came up between 2008 and 2010. However, the local community voted against the project.

Since 2013, a new industrial site is being expanded on the southern harbour. E.ON, RWE and WindMW plan to manage operation and services of large offshore windparks from Heligoland. The range had been cleared of leftover ammunition.

Demographics
At the beginning of 2020, 1,399 people lived on Heligoland. As of 2018, the population is mostly Lutheran (63%), while a minority (18%) is Catholic.

Climate
The climate of Heligoland is typical of an offshore climate, being almost free of pollen and thus ideal for people with pollen allergies. Since there is no land mass in the vicinity, temperatures rarely drop below  even in the winter. At times, winter temperatures can be higher than in Hamburg by up to  because cold winds from Russia are weakened. While spring tends to be comparatively cool, autumn on Heligoland is often longer and warmer than on the mainland, and statistically, the climate is generally sunnier.

Owing to the mild climate, figs have reportedly been grown on the island as early as 1911, and a 2005 article mentioned Japanese bananas, figs, agaves, palm trees and other exotic plants that had been planted on Heligoland and were thriving. There still is an old mulberry tree in the Upper Town.

Geology

The island of Heligoland is a geological oddity; the presence of the main island's characteristic red sedimentary rock in the middle of the German Bight is unusual. It is the only such formation of cliffs along the continental coast of the North Sea. The formation itself, called the Bunter sandstone or Buntsandstein, is from the early Triassic geologic age. It is older than the white chalk that underlies the island Düne, the same rock that forms the White Cliffs of Dover in England and cliffs of Danish and German islands in the Baltic Sea. A small chalk rock close to Heligoland, called witt Kliff (white cliff), is known to have existed within sight of the island to the west until the early 18th century, when storm floods finally eroded it to below sea level.

Heligoland's rock is significantly harder than the postglacial sediments and sands forming the islands and coastlines to the east of the island. This is why the core of the island, which a thousand years ago was still surrounded by a large, low-lying marshland and sand dunes separated from coast in the east only by narrow channels, has remained to this day, although the onset of the North Sea has long eroded away all of its surroundings. A small piece of Heligoland's sand dunes remains—the sand isle just across the harbour called Düne (Dune). A referendum in June 2011 dismissed a proposal to reconnect the main island to the Düne islet with a landfill.

Flag

The Heligoland flag is very similar to its coat of arms—it is a tricolour flag with three horizontal bars, from top to bottom: green, red and white. Each of the colours has its symbolic meaning, as expressed in its motto:

Road restrictions

A special section in the German traffic regulations (Straßenverkehrsordnung, abbr. StVO), §50, prohibits the use of automobiles and bicycles on the island. Kick scooters are sometimes used as substitutes for bicycles.

There are very few cars on Heligoland; except for the local ambulance van and the small firetrucks, the only motor vehicles on the island are electrically powered and used primarily for moving material. The island received its first police car on 17 January 2006; until then the island's policemen moved on foot and by bicycle, being exempt from the bicycle ban.

Emergency services
Ambulance services are provided by the Paracelsus North Sea Clinic Helgoland in cooperation with the State Rescue Service of Schleswig-Holstein (RKiSH). There are three ambulances available: one on the main island and one on Düne; the third is in reserve on the main island.

The ambulance service drives first to the Paracelsus North Sea Clinic. In the event of serious injuries or illnesses, the patients are transferred to the mainland with a rescue helicopter or a sea rescue cruiser operated by the German Society for the Rescue of Shipwrecked Persons (DGzRS).

If there is an emergency on the Düne, the ambulance crew takes a boat to the dune and carries out the operation with the ambulance based there.

Fire protection and technical assistance are provided by the Helgoland volunteer fire brigade, which has three stations (Unterland, Oberland and Düne).The tasks also include ensuring fire protection during flight operations at the Heligoland-Düne airfield. Volunteer firefighters are deployed on Düne in the summer, who report for 14 days and go on holiday with their families on the island and go into action in an emergency.

There are normally five police officers based on Heligoland. They have the use of an electric car and a number of bicycles. In the summer months the population can also triple with up to 3,000 daytrippers and additional overnight visitors. Occasionally the usual complement of police officers in supplemented by additional officers from the mainland during this period.

Since 2021, the so-called BOS center, a joint service building for the fire brigade, ambulance service and police, has been under construction on the Oberland, and will incorporate five apartments for police staff on the upper floor.

Notable residents
 Heinrich Gätke (1814–1897), artist and ornithologist
 Georg C. F. Greve (born 1973 in Heligoland) software developer, physicist and author
 John Hindmarsh (1785–1860), veteran of the Battle of Trafalgar and first governor of South Australia, was the governor of Heligoland 1840–56.
 James Krüss (1926–1997) a German writer of children's and picture books, illustrator, poet, dramatist and scriptwriter
 Richard Mansfield (1857–1907), actor
 Peter Andresen Oelrichs (1781–1869) a lexicographer and linguist.
 Robert Knud Friedrich Pilger (1876–1953) botanist born in Heligoland, specialised in the study of conifers.
 Eva von der Osten (1881–1936), the soprano, was born here.
 August Uihlein (1842–1911) a German-American brewer, business executive and horse breeder

In culture
 Heligoland appeared in the British Shipping Forecast up until 1956 when it was renamed German Bight. The name of Shena Mackay's 2003 novel Heligoland is prompted by its disappearance from the forecast.
 Physicist Carlo Rovelli titled his 2020 popular science book on quantum mechanics Helgoland. This is because Werner Heisenberg got the first intuition about the theory while staying on the island in the 1920s.
 In the game Battlefield 1, Heligoland Bight appeared as a map in the turning tides expansion DLC with the German army defending against the British Royal Marines.

Leaders of Heligoland

Lieutenant-Governors
The British Lieutenant-Governors of Heligoland from 1807 to 1890 were:
 1807–1808: Corbet James d'Auvergne
 1808–1815: William Osborne Hamilton (1750-1818)
 1815–1840: Sir Henry King
 1840–1856: Sir John Hindmarsh
 1857–1863: Richard Pattinson
 1863–1881: Sir Henry Berkeley Fitzhardinge Maxse
 1881–1888: Sir John Terence Nicholls O'Brien
 1888–1890: Arthur Cecil Stuart Barkly

See also
 Forseti—a Norse god whose central place of worship was at Heligoland
 Location hypotheses of Atlantis—Heligoland is hypothesized as a possible location for Atlantis by the Austrian-born author Jürgen Spanuth.
 Postage stamps and postal history of Heligoland

References

Further reading

Papers
 
  Historical synopsis with review of modern economy and society on Heligoland.

Books
 Andres, Jörg: Insel Helgoland. Die »Seefestung« und ihr Erbe. Ch. Links Verlag, Berlin 2015, .
 
 Dierschke, Jochen: Die Vogelwelt der Insel Helgoland. Missing Link E. G., 2011, .
  (originally published in 2002)
 Friederichs, A.: Wir wollten Helgoland retten – Auf den Spuren der Widerstandsgruppe von 1945. Museum Helgoland, 2010, .
 Grahn-Hoek, Heike: Roter Flint und Heiliges Land Helgoland. Wachholtz-Verlag, Neumünster 2009, .
 
 Wallmann, Eckhard: Eine Kolonie wird deutsch – Helgoland zwischen den Weltkriegen. Nordfriisk Instituut, Bredstedt 2012, .

External links

 Film clip of coast defenses 
 Heligoland Tourist Board – includes an aerial photograph of Heligoland (front) and Düne (back).
 Site about planting palms on Heligoland
 Heligoland Bird Observatory
 Footage of Destruction of Heligoland fortifications April 1947

 
Archipelagoes of Germany
Landforms of Schleswig-Holstein
Special territories of the European Union
Archipelagoes of the North Sea
Former British colonies and protectorates in Europe
Car-free zones in Europe
Germany–United Kingdom relations
Pinneberg (district)
Frisian Islands
1807 establishments in the British Empire
1890 disestablishments in the British Empire
Special economic zones
Duty-free zones of Europe
Tax avoidance